Athletes from the Federal Republic of Yugoslavia competed at the 2002 Winter Olympics in Salt Lake City, United States.

Alpine skiing

Men

Women

Bobsleigh

Men

References
Official Olympic Reports
 Olympic Winter Games 2002, full results by sports-reference.com

Nations at the 2002 Winter Olympics
2002
Olympics